The Fatah Alliance, also sometimes translated as the Conquest Alliance, is a political coalition in Iraq formed to contest the 2018 general election. The main components are groups involved in the Popular Mobilization Forces which is mainly a state-sponsored umbrella organization made up of Iraqi Shiite Muslims who fought from 2014 to 2017 alongside the Iraqi Army to defeat ISIL. It is led by Hadi Al-Amiri, the leader of the Badr Organization.

Members
The Fatah Alliance included the Badr Organisation, the Al-Sadiqoun Bloc (the political wing of Asa'ib Ahl al-Haq, AAH), Kata'ib Hezbollah and Kata'ib al-Imam Ali, all key components of the Hashd. The Fatah Alliance agreed to run jointly with al-Abadi's Nasr al-Iraq (Victory of Iraq) list, but the agreement fell apart after only 24 hours, reportedly over Abadi's conditions. The Badr Organisation, headed by Hadi Al-Amiri, was previously part of the ruling State of Law Coalition and announced their withdrawal from the Alliance in December 2017, and won 22 seats.

Asa'ib Ahl al-Haq split from the Sadrist Movement in 2004. It has also been one of the main Iraqi armed groups active in the Syrian Civil War. They have received funding and training from Iran's Quds Force and, like many Sadrists, are reported to have religious allegiance to the Iranian Grand Ayatollah Kazem al-Haeri. AAH formed a political wing, called the Al-Sadiqoun Bloc, to contest the 2014 Iraqi parliamentary election, winning one seat.

Electoral results

Iraqi Parliament
They were expected to win 37 seats in the parliament in 2018 elections, according to one opinion poll.

See also
Alliance Towards Reforms
Victory Alliance

References

2018 establishments in Iraq
Iran–Iraq relations
Political parties established in 2018
Shia Islam in Iraq
Shia Islamic political parties
Political party alliances in Iraq
Popular Mobilization Forces
Iraqi nationalism
Nationalist parties in Iraq
Khomeinist groups